A lithium ion manganese oxide battery (LMO) is a lithium-ion cell that uses manganese dioxide, as the cathode material. Cathodes based on manganese-oxide components are earth-abundant, inexpensive, non-toxic, and provide better thermal stability.

Compounds

Spinel 
In addition to containing inexpensive materials, the three-dimensional structure of  lends itself to high rate capability by providing a well connected framework for the insertion and de-insertion of  ions during discharge and charge of the battery. In particular, the  ions occupy the tetrahedral sites within the  polyhedral frameworks adjacent to empty octahedral sites. As a consequence of this structural arrangement, batteries based on  cathodes have demonstrated a higher rate-capability compared to materials with two-dimensional frameworks for  diffusion.

At this concentration, the formally Mn(III) at the surface can disproportionate to form Mn(IV) and Mn(II) by the Hunter mechanism. The Mn(II) formed is soluble in most electrolytes and its dissolution degrades the cathode. With this in mind many manganese cathodes are substituted or doped to keep the average manganese oxidation state above +3.5 during battery use or they will suffer from lower overall capacities as a function of cycle life and temperature.

Layered 
In the nomenclature of layered compounds it can be written Li(Li0.33Mn0.67)O2. Although  is electrochemically inactive, it can be charged to a high potential (4.5 V v.s Li0) in order to undergo lithiation/de-lithiation or delithiated using an acid leaching process followed by mild heat treatment. New allotropes of  have been discovered which have better structural stability against oxygen release (longer cycle-life).

Layered 
The layered manganese oxide  is constructed from corrugated layers of manganese/oxide octahedra and is electrochemically unstable.  The distortions and deviation from truly planar metal oxide layers are a manifestation of the electronic configuration of the Mn(III) Jahn-Teller ion.  A layered variant, isostructural with LiCoO2, was prepared in 1996 by ion exchange from the layered compound NaMnO2, however long term cycling and the defect nature of the charged compound led to structural degradation and cation equilibration to other phases.

Layered 
The material is typically made by low voltage lithiation of the parent compound, direct lithiation using liquid ammonia, or via use of an organic lithiating reagent. Stability on cycling has been demonstrated in symmetric cells although due to Mn(II) formation and dissolution cycling degradation is expected. Stabilization of the structure using dopants and substitutions to decrease the amount of reduced manganese cations has been a successful route to extending the cycle life of these lithium rich reduced phases. These layered manganese oxide layers are so rich in lithium.

x   • y  • z LiMnO2 composites
One of the main research efforts in the field of lithium-manganese oxide electrodes for lithium-ion batteries involves developing composite electrodes using structurally integrated layered , layered LiMnO2, and spinel , with a chemical formula of x   • y  • z LiMnO2, where x+y+z=1. The combination of these structures provides increased structural stability during electrochemical cycling while achieving higher capacity and rate-capability. A rechargeable capacity in excess of 250 mAh/g was reported in 2005 using this material, which has nearly twice the capacity of current commercialized rechargeable batteries of the same dimensions.

See also
 List of battery types
 List of battery sizes
 Comparison of battery types

References

Lithium-ion batteries